Adventureland is a 2009 American comedy-drama film written and directed by Greg Mottola, starring Jesse Eisenberg and Kristen Stewart and co-starring Ryan Reynolds, Kristen Wiig, Bill Hader, Martin Starr, and Margarita Levieva. Set in the summer of 1987, recent college grad James Brennan (Eisenberg) is making big plans to tour Europe and attend graduate school in pursuit of a career in journalism. However, financial problems force him to look for a summer job instead of traveling abroad, which places him at Adventureland, a run-down amusement park in western Pennsylvania and loosely based on the "Adventureland" local theme park in Farmingdale, New York. There he meets Emily Lewin (Stewart), a co-worker with whom he develops a quick rapport and relationship.

Released on April 3, 2009, the film received positive reviews and earned $17.1 million worldwide at the box office. It was nominated for "Best Ensemble Cast Performance" at the 19th Annual Gotham Independent Film Awards.

Plot 
In 1987, James Brennan plans to have a summer vacation in Europe after graduating from Oberlin College. His parents inform him that their current finances will not permit them to support him and he will have to spend the summer working instead. James gets a job working the carnival games at Adventureland, a local amusement park in his hometown of Pittsburgh, Pennsylvania, where his childhood friend Tommy Frigo works.  Another games worker, Emily "Em" Lewin, saves James from being stabbed by a cheating customer and offers him a ride home that night.

With her father and stepmother out of town, Em throws a party. At the party, Em and James discover they share a similar taste in music. Em persuades James to join her in her swimming pool, but an unfortunately timed erection humiliates him in front of everyone. After the party, Mike Connell, who is married and has been having an affair with Em, comes over and they have sex. As the love triangle between Mike, Em, and James continues to develop, other romances blossom between their coworkers at Adventureland. James also has a brief romance with rides worker Lisa P.

Another of James' coworkers tells James that one night, he saw Em and Connell doing "pushups without any pants on" in the back of Connell's car. Frigo drives James to Connell's mother's house and they see Em leaving. James tells Lisa about the affair and asks her not to tell anyone, but she tells her friend Kelly and soon afterwards the news spreads throughout the park. Em quits and moves back to New York. James gets drunk, crashes his father's car into their neighbor's tree, and passes out. The next morning, James' prospective grad school roommate decides to go to Harvard Business School instead, leaving him with nowhere to live in New York.

James heads to New York City and waits outside Em's apartment in the rain. When she arrives, she invites him in and they reconcile.

Cast 

 Jesse Eisenberg as James Brennan, a recent graduate of Oberlin College who majored in Comparative Literature and Renaissance Studies. He is an aspiring journalist who has to get a summer job so he can afford to go to Columbia University in New York. The only job he can get is in the games at the Adventureland theme park. He is a virgin and occasional marijuana smoker. Throughout his summer working in Adventureland, Brennan develops a relationship with Em, whom he soon begins dating.
 Kristen Stewart as Em Lewin, one of James' Adventureland co-workers and love interest. She has a troubled home life; she hates her stepmother and resents her father for remarrying so soon after her mother's death from cancer. She is a student at New York University majoring in Art History. She does not need to work, as her father is a rich lawyer, but she works in the games at the theme park to get out of the house. She is secretly having an affair with the park's maintenance man, Mike Connell, but eventually calls it off, and quits Adventureland after her affair becomes public knowledge. She later falls in love with James and begins a romantic relationship with him in New York.
 Martin Starr as Joel, one of James' co-workers at the games in Adventureland and James' friend in the summer. He is a college student studying Russian Literature and Slavic Languages, a degree which he claims will get him a job as a "cabbie, hot dog vendor," or "marijuana delivery guy." He eventually quits the park after being attacked by a disgruntled customer and leaves Pittsburgh to head for an undisclosed location. He enjoys smoking a pipe, although he calls it a "revolting affectation."
 Kristen Wiig as Paulette, Bobby's wife and manager of Adventureland. She is much quieter than her husband.
 Bill Hader as Bobby, the assistant manager of Adventureland. He is extremely intolerant of people who litter but is very supportive of his employees and caring for his wife.
 Margarita Levieva as Lisa P., one of the rides operators at the Adventureland park. A seductive girl to whom all the park's employees are attracted. Her father was injured and is now unable to work, and she bonds with James after he shows some sympathy for her. She invites James out on a date, but he leaves her to go back with Em. She eventually tells her friends at Adventureland that Em is having an affair with Connell, a secret she told James she would not reveal.
 Jack Gilpin as Mr. Brennan, James' father. He loses his job and transfers to a different office. He is an alcoholic, but he tries to hide his drinking from his family. James finds a bottle of scotch underneath his dad's car seat, and he drinks the bottle while driving and crashes into his neighbor's tree. He doesn't tell his mother that the bottle belonged to his father.
 Josh Pais as Mr. Lewin, Em's father and Francy's husband. He met Francy at temple while his first wife was slowly dying in the hospital. He married Francy, soon after Em's mother died.
 Wendie Malick as Mrs. Brennan, James' mother. She is the one that lets James know they can't help pay for neither his trip nor help with his rent for graduate school. She supplies the discipline of the two parents. However at the end of the film, she decides to let James go off to New York City.
 Mary Birdsong as Francy, Em's stepmother. She married Em's father shortly after the death of Em's mother. After her first divorce, she lost her hair from the stress of a nervous breakdown and wears a wig. Em says that if she were not a "status-obsessed witch",  she might feel bad for her.
 Matt Bush as Tommy Frigo, James' childhood best friend. Although they aren't good friends any more, James still manages to tolerate Frigo's immaturity and cruelty. Frigo constantly teases James and hits him in the testicles, repeatedly, often bringing him to his knees in pain. He even goes so far as to blackmail James about his date with Lisa P. At the end of the film, James hits Frigo in the testicles first for once before heading off to New York, finally getting his revenge.
 Paige Howard as Sue O'Malley, Pete's sister, another of the young workers at Adventureland. Makes out with Joel one drunken night, then harshly dumps him by claiming religious differences.
 Dan Bittner as Pete O'Malley, Sue's brother, another of the young workers at Adventureland. He hits on Lisa P., who is unimpressed and asks out James in front of him.
 Ryan Reynolds as Mike Connell, the park's maintenance man, married to a woman named Ronnie. He is also a part-time musician who claims to have jammed with Lou Reed. Through slips in his musical knowledge, it becomes apparent to James that this is not true. He has cheated on his wife with many women, including Em.

Production 
Adventureland was filmed in Pittsburgh, Pennsylvania, from October 2007 to December 2007, or possibly until January 2008, with most scenes shot in Kennywood, a historic amusement park in nearby West Mifflin, Pennsylvania. The park was "heavily" altered to look run-down. The theme park from the film is based on the Farmingdale, New York amusement park Adventureland where Mottola once worked in the 1980s. The scenes of the family home were filmed in a neighborhood named Fox Ridge located in the town of McCandless, a suburb still within Allegheny County and approximately 12 miles north of the city of Pittsburgh. Other scenes were shot in Beaver County, Pennsylvania, and the airport area of Moon Township such as the Stardust Lounge.

The story takes place during the summer, but since it was shot in the winter months in Pittsburgh, Pennsylvania, crews had to often hide snowfall. In some instances, during indoor takes, extras were paid to stand outside surrounding the windows and doors to block the snow falling behind the actors.

Release 
The film premiered at the 2009 Sundance Film Festival and was theatrically released on April 3, 2009. The film was also screened at the 2009 Edinburgh International Film Festival.

Box office 

In its first week at the box office, Adventureland opened moderately wide in only 1,862 screens grossing $5.7 million ranking #6 at the box office. Despite opening up in fourteen more screens in its second week Adventureland only took in $3.4 million, falling to #9 at the box office. The film concluded its U.S. domestic run on May 28, 2009 with a gross of $16,044,025 and a total international gross of  $17,164,377.

Home media 

The film was released August 25, 2009 on DVD and Blu-ray with unrated bonus features.

Reception

Critical response 

On Rotten Tomatoes, the film has an approval rating of 89% based on 218 reviews, with an average rating of 7.30/10. The site's critical consensus reads, "Full of humor and nostalgia, Adventureland is a sweet, insightful coming-of-age comedy that will resonate with teens and adults alike." On Metacritic, the film has a weighted average score of 76 out of 100, based on 34 critics, indicating "generally favorable reviews".

Roger Ebert of the Chicago Sun-Times gave the film 3 out of 4 stars and wrote: "What surprised me was how much I admired Kristen Stewart, who in 'Twilight,' was playing below her grade level. Here is an actress ready to do important things. Together, and with the others, they make 'Adventureland' more real and more touching than it may sound."
Variety's Todd McCarthy wrote: "A rather ordinary account of youthful summer misadventures that goes down easily thanks to a sparky cast, more than 40 pop tunes that anchor the action in the late '80s and characters who get high both on and off their jobs at a tacky amusement park."

Accolades 

The film was nominated for a Gotham Independent Film Award for Best Ensemble Cast, scheduled in New York City on November 30, 2009.

Adventureland was the winner of High Times magazine's 2009 Stoner Movie of the Year Award. Kristen Stewart also received High Times 2009 Stonette of the Year Award, due in part to her performance in the film.

Jesse Eisenberg was nominated for Favorite Male Breakthrough Performance at the Teen Choice Awards for his performance in both Adventureland and Zombieland.

Soundtrack 

A total of 41 songs were licensed for use in the film. The soundtrack includes 14 songs and was released on April 1, 2009 by Hollywood Records. The songs included are mostly from the 1980s, to fit with the setting of the film, with several tracks from the late 1960s and early 1970s, most notably by The Velvet Underground, Lou Reed, the New York Dolls and cult darlings Big Star. The '80s bands represent a cross section of alternative bands from the time including Hüsker Dü, The Jesus and Mary Chain, Nick Lowe, The Cure, The Replacements, and Crowded House.

The film maintains a notable reverence for Lou Reed, who is idolized by the main character, featured on T-shirts and posters of other cast members and has likewise elevated the status of the playground mechanic stemming from a rumored jam session with the artist. Earlier versions of the script replaced Lou Reed with singer-songwriter Neil Young as the musician Ryan Reynolds's character had played with, and used Young's songs "Everybody Knows This Is Nowhere" and "Hey Hey, My My (Into The Black)" in key scenes.

References

External links 

 
 
 
 
 

2000s coming-of-age comedy-drama films
2009 romantic comedy-drama films
2000s teen comedy-drama films
2009 films
American coming-of-age comedy-drama films
American romantic comedy-drama films
American teen comedy-drama films
Films about virginity
Films directed by Greg Mottola
2009 independent films
Films produced by Anne Carey
Films produced by Sidney Kimmel
Films set in 1987
Films set in amusement parks
Films set in Pittsburgh
Films shot in Pittsburgh
Miramax films
Sidney Kimmel Entertainment films
2009 comedy films
2009 drama films
2000s English-language films
2000s American films